Allion may refer to:

 Toyota Allion, model of sedan manufactured by Toyota
 Allion Healthcare, former healthcare drug company based in New York